In music, 31 equal temperament, 31-ET, which can also be abbreviated 31-TET (31 tone ET) or 31-EDO (equal division of the octave), also known as tricesimoprimal, is the tempered scale derived by dividing the octave into 31 equal-sized steps (equal frequency ratios).

31-ET is a very good approximation of quarter-comma meantone temperament. More generally, it is a regular diatonic tuning in which the tempered perfect fifth is equal to 696.77 cents, as shown in Figure 1. On an isomorphic keyboard, the fingering of music composed in 31-ET is precisely the same as it is in any other syntonic tuning (such as 12-ET), so long as the notes are spelled properly—that is, with no assumption of enharmonicity.

History and use

Division of the octave into 31 steps arose naturally out of Renaissance music theory; the lesser diesis—the ratio of an octave to three major thirds, 128:125 or 41.06 cents—was approximately a fifth of a tone or a third of a semitone. In 1555, Nicola Vicentino proposed an extended-meantone tuning of 31 tones. In 1666, Lemme Rossi first proposed an equal temperament of this order. In 1691, having discovered it independently, scientist Christiaan Huygens wrote about it also. Huygens not only realized this, he went farther and noted that 31-ET provides an excellent approximation of septimal, or 7-limit harmony. In the twentieth century, physicist, music theorist and composer Adriaan Fokker, after reading Huygens's work, led a revival of interest in this system of tuning which led to a number of compositions, particularly by Dutch composers. Fokker designed the Fokker organ, a 31-tone equal-tempered organ, which was installed in Teyler's Museum in Haarlem in 1951 and moved to Muziekgebouw aan 't IJ in 2010 where it has been frequently used in concerts since it moved.

Interval size

Here are the sizes of some common intervals:

The 31 equal temperament has a very close fit to the 7:6, 8:7, and 7:5 ratios, which have no approximate fits in 12 equal temperament and only poor fits in 19 equal temperament. The composer Joel Mandelbaum (born 1932) used this tuning system specifically because of its good matches to the 7th and 11th partials in the harmonic series.  The tuning has poor matches to both the 9:8 and 10:9 intervals (major and minor tone in just intonation); however, it has a good match for the average of the two. Practically it is very close to quarter-comma meantone.

This tuning can be considered a meantone temperament. It has the necessary property that a chain of its four fifths is equivalent to its major third (the syntonic comma 81:80 is tempered out), which also means that it contains a "meantone" that falls between the sizes of 10:9 and 9:8 as the combination of one of each of its chromatic and diatonic semitones.

Scale diagram

The following are the 31 notes in the scale:

The five "double flat" notes and five "double sharp" notes may be replaced by half sharps and half flats, similar to the quarter tone system:

Chords of 31 equal temperament 

Many chords of 31-ET are discussed in the article on septimal meantone temperament. Chords not discussed there include the neutral thirds triad, which might be written C–E–G, C–D–G or C–F–G, and the Orwell tetrad, which is C–E–F–B.

Usual chords like the major chord are rendered nicely in 31-ET because the third and the fifth are very well approximated. Also, it is possible to play subminor chords (where the first third is subminor) and supermajor chords (where the first third is supermajor).

It is also possible to render nicely the harmonic seventh chord. For example on C with C–E–G–A. The seventh here is different from stacking a fifth and a minor third, which instead yields B to make a dominant seventh. This difference cannot be made in 12-ET.

See also
Archicembalo, alternate keyboard instrument with 36 keys per octave that was sometimes tuned as 31TET.

References

External links
 The Huygens Fokker foundation for micro-tonal music, in Dutch and English
 Fokker, Adriaan Daniël, Equal Temperament and the Thirty-one-keyed organ
 Rapoport, Paul, About 31-tone Equal Temperament
 Terpstra, Siemen, Toward a Theory of Meantone (and 31-et) Harmony
 Barbieri, Patrizio. Enharmonic instruments and music, 1470-1900. (2008) Latina, Il Levante Libreria Editrice
 M. Khramov, "Approximation to 7-Limit Just Intonation in a Scale of 31EDO", Proceedings of the FRSM-2009 International Symposium Frontiers of Research on Speech and Music, pp. 73–82, ABV IIITM, Gwalior, 2009.
 31 Tone Equal Temperament

Equal temperaments
Microtonality